Gwilym Meredith Edwards (10 June 1917 – 8 February 1999) was a Welsh character actor and writer.

He was born in Rhosllannerchrugog, Denbighshire, Wales, the son of a collier, and attended Ruabon Boys' Grammar School. He became an actor in 1938, first with the Welsh National Theatre Company, then the Liverpool Playhouse. He was a Christian conscientious objector in the Second World War, serving in the Non-Combatant Corps, before being seconded to the National Fire Service in Liverpool and London. His film appearances include A Run for Your Money (1949), The Blue Lamp (1950), The Magnet (1950), The Lavender Hill Mob (1951), The Cruel Sea (1953), The Great Game (1953), The Long Arm (1956), Dunkirk (1958) and Tiger Bay (1959). He appeared as the murderous butler in the cult television series Randall and Hopkirk (Deceased) in 1969, and as Tom in the cult children's science fiction serial Sky in 1975. He also played Thomas Charles Edwards in the 1978 BBC drama series Off to Philadelphia in the Morning and Richard Lloyd in the 1981 TV series The Life and Times of David Lloyd George.

A Welsh nationalist and Welsh speaker, he stood as Plaid Cymru candidate for Denbigh in the 1966 general election. He was awarded an honorary degree in 1997 by the University of Wales, and was a member of the Gorsedd of Bards.

He married Daisy Clark in 1942. They had two sons and a daughter. He is the father of actor Ioan Meredith and the grandfather of actors Ifan Meredith and Rhys Meredith.

Partial filmography

 A Run for Your Money (1949) – Twm
 The Blue Lamp (1950) – PC Hughes
 The Magnet (1950) – Harper
 Midnight Episode (1950) – Detective Sergeant Taylor
 There Is Another Sun (1951) – Bratcher
 The Lavender Hill Mob (1951) – P.C. Williams
 Where No Vultures Fly (1951) – Gwyl Davis
 The Last Page (1952) – Inspector Dale
 Gift Horse (1952) – Jones
 The Gambler and the Lady (1952) – Dave Davies
 Girdle of Gold (1952) – Griffiths the Hearse
 The Great Game (1953) – Skid Evans
 The Cruel Sea (1953) – Yeoman Wells
 A Day to Remember (1953) – Bert Tripp
 Meet Mr. Malcolm (1954) – Whistler Grant
 Devil on Horseback (1954) – Ted Fellowes
 Final Appointment (1954) – Tom Martin
 To Dorothy a Son (1954) – Carter
 Mad About Men (1954) – Police Constable (uncredited)
 Mask of Dust (1954) – Laurence Gibson
 Burnt Evidence (1954) – Police Inspector Bob Edwards
 Lost (1956) – Sgt. Davies
 The Long Arm (1956) – Mr. Thomas
 Town on Trial (1957) – Sgt. Rogers
 Escapement (1958) – Dr. Phillip Maxwell
 Dunkirk (1958) – Dave Bellman
 Law and Disorder (1958) – Sergeant Bolton
 Tiger Bay (1959) – P.C. Williams
 The Trials of Oscar Wilde (1960) – Auctioneer
 Doctor in Love (1960) – Father
 Flame in the Streets (1961) – Harry Mitchell
 Only Two Can Play (1962) – Clergyman on the Committee
 Mix Me a Person (1962) – Johnson
 This Is My Street (1964) – Steve
 The Great St Trinian's Train Robbery (1966) – Chairman
 Gulliver's Travels (1977) – Uncle

References

External links
 

1917 births
1999 deaths
Welsh male film actors
Welsh male television actors
People from Rhosllanerchrugog
Welsh conscientious objectors
Calvinist pacifists
Bards of the Gorsedd
People educated at Ruabon Grammar School
Personnel of the Non-Combatant Corps
20th-century Welsh male actors
Welsh-speaking actors
Plaid Cymru parliamentary candidates
Military personnel from Denbighshire